TigerGraph is a private company headquartered in Redwood City, California. It provides graph database and graph analytics software.

History

TigerGraph was founded in 2012 by programmer Dr. Yu Xu under the name GraphSQL.

In September 2017, the company came out of stealth mode under the name TigerGraph with $33 million in funding. It raised an additional $32 million in funding in September 2019 and another $105 million in a series C round in February 2021. Cumulative funding as of March 2021 is $170 million.

Products

TigerGraph's hybrid transactional/analytical processing database and analytics software can scale to tens of terabytes of data with billions of edges, and is used for data intensive applications such as fraud detection, customer data analysis (customer 360), IoT, artificial intelligence and machine learning. It is available using the cloud computing delivery model. The analytics uses C++ based software and a parallel processing engine to process algorithms and queries. It has its own graph query language that is similar to SQL. TigerGraph also provides a software development kit for creating graphs and visual representations.

As of January 2022, TigerGraph version is up to Graph version 3.

Reception
A 2018 review of TigerGraph 2.2 in Infoworld gave the product 4.5 out of 5 stars.

Query Language
GSQL is a SQL-like Turing complete query language designed by TigerGraph.

See also
 Graph Query Language

References

External links
 Official website
 TigerGraph Paper at SIGMOD Conference

Graph databases
Databases
Structured storage